Dernjava is the second studio album by the Croatian alternative rock band Pips, Chips & Videoclips. The album was released in December 1995, two years after their debut Shimpoo Pimpoo. The album was recorded in the period between May and July 1995 in Zagreb.

Dernjava won the Porin Award for Best Alternative Rock Album in 1996.

Track listing
"R'n'R zvijezda"
"Svaku noć sam pijan"
"Poštar lakog sna"
"Ljubav"
"Mafija"
"You'll Never Walk Alone"
"Malena"
"Bolestan"
"Pjevač Beatlesa & Stonesa"
"Novac"
"Patuljci iz šervudske šume"
"Ljubav (feat Soulfingers)"
"Mafija (Apache version)"

References

External links
Pips, Chips & Videoclips discography 

1995 albums
Pips, Chips & Videoclips albums